Shadi Bartsch-Zimmer (born March 17, 1966) is an American academic and is the Helen A. Regenstein Distinguished Service Professor of Classics at the University of Chicago.  She has previously held professorships at the University of California, Berkeley and Brown University where she was the W. Duncan MacMillan II Professor of Classics in 2008-2009.

Life
Bartsch is the daughter of a UN economist and spent her childhood in London, Geneva (where she studied at the International School of Geneva), Tehran, Jakarta, and the Fiji Islands.  She earned a B.A. summa cum laude from Princeton University in 1987 and both her M.A. and Ph.D. (1992) from the University of California, Berkeley in Latin and classics, respectively.  She is married to Robert Zimmer.

Career
Bartsch has contributed to classical scholarship in the areas of the literature and culture of Julio-Claudian Rome, the ancient novel, Roman stoicism, and the classical tradition. She was awarded the Quantrell Award for Excellence in Undergraduate Teaching in the College in 2000 and the Faculty Award for Excellence in Graduate Teaching in 2006 at the University of Chicago. She was awarded an ACLS Fellowship in 1999 and a Guggenheim Fellowship in 2007. Bartsch served as Chair of the Faculty Board of the University of Chicago Press from 2006-2008 and Editor-in-Chief of Classical Philology from 2000-2004 and 2014 onwards.  She has been appointed the Inaugural Director of the Institute on the Formation of Knowledge and is currently the lead editor of the journal KNOW:  A Journal on the Formation of Knowledge.

Books published
Decoding the Ancient Novel: The Reader and the Role of Description in Heliodorus and Achilles Tatius. (1989)
Actors in the Audience: Theatricality and Doublespeak from Nero to Hadrian. (1994)
Ideology in Cold Blood: A Reading of Lucan’s Civil War. (1998)
Oxford Encyclopedia of Rhetoric. (as editor with Thomas Sloane, Heinrich Plett, and Thomas Farrell, 2001)
Erotikon: Essays on Eros, Ancient and Modern, (as editor with Thomas Bartscherer, 2005)
The Mirror of the Self: Sexuality, Self-Knowledge, and the Gaze in the Early Roman Empire (2006) 
Ekphrasis. (a special issue of Classical Philology, as editor with Jas Elsner, 2007)
Seneca and the Self, (as editor with David Wray, 2009)
Persius:  A Study in Food, Philosophy, and the Figural. (2015; winner of the Charles J. Goodwin award)
The Cambridge Companion to Seneca, as editor with Alessandro Schiesaro, 2015)
The Cambridge Companion to the Age of Nero, (as editor with Kirk Freudenburg and Cedric Littlewood, 2017)
The Chicago Seneca in Translation Series, (as series editor with Martha Nussbaum and Elizabeth Asmis, 2008 - 2017)
Plato Goes to China: The Greek Classics and Chinese Nationalism. (2023)

Translations
Seneca's Medea  
Seneca's Thyestes  
Seneca's Phaedra 
Virgil: The Aeneid (2021)

References

External links
 https://web.archive.org/web/20080628210853/http://humanities.uchicago.edu/depts/classics/people/bartschindex.html
 http://today.brown.edu/faculty/2008/bartsch
 "CONNECTIONS; Eros and its Dizzying Masks", from The New York Times, March 10, 2001
 https://shadibartsch.com
 https://ifk.uchicago.edu/

1966 births
Living people
Princeton University alumni
University of California, Berkeley alumni
Classical scholars of Brown University
Classical scholars of the University of California, Berkeley
Classical scholars of the University of Chicago
American classical scholars
Women classical scholars
International School of Geneva alumni
Scholars of Latin literature